Narsingdi railway station is a railway station located in Narsingdi, Narsingdi District, Bangladesh.

History
This station is a former junction station and the railway was built in 1970 from here to Madanganj in Narayanganj. The line was closed in 1977 due to traffic problems. The railway line was removed in 1984. which has been used as a roadway since 2004.

References

External link
 

Railway stations in Dhaka Division
Railway stations opened in 1914